The  is a railway line operated by West Japan Railway Company (JR West) in Nara Prefecture. It connects Nara on the Yamatoji Line to Takada on the Wakayama Line, with some services continuing on the Wakayama Line to Ōji Station, and then to JR Namba on the Yamatoji Line. Starting on March 13, 2010, it is referred to by the nickname " in reference to the large number of ancient landmarks along the line's route.

History
The Osaka Railway Co. opened the Takada - Sakurai section in 1893, and the Nara Railway Co. opened the Sakurai - Kyobate section in 1898, extending the line to Nara the following year.

In 1900 the Osaka Railway Co. merged with the Kansai Railway Co., and the Nara Railway Co. did likewise in 1905. In 1907 the Kansai Railway Co. was nationalised.

CTC signalling was commissioned in 1979, and the line was electrified in 1980. Freight services ceased in 1983.

Former connecting lines
 Sakurai station - 
The Osaka Electric Railway Co. operated a 6km line to Hatsuse between 1909 and 1938.

The Yamoto Railway Co. line from Oji connected between 1923 and 1944, when that line closed beyond Tawaramoto station.

 Unebi station - The Kintetsu Railway Osa line connected here between 1924 and 1945.

Stations

Rolling stock
 103 series
 201 series (until 2023)
 221 series
 227-1000 series (from Spring 2019)

Former
 105 series (until 2020)
 113 series

See also
 List of railway lines in Japan

References

Lines of West Japan Railway Company
Rail transport in Nara Prefecture
1067 mm gauge railways in Japan
Railway lines opened in 1893